The spotted smooth dogfish (Proscyllium venustum) is a finback catshark of the family Proscylliidae, found in the temperate northwest Pacific Ocean, in the Okinawa Trough.  Little else is known about this harmless oviparous species.

References

 

spotted smooth dogfish
East China Sea
spotted smooth dogfish